Egoista may refer to:
 "Egoísta", a 2010 song by Belinda
 "Egoista" (Alexia song), 2003
 Lamborghini Egoista, a Lamborghini sports car